Salnikov is a surname of Russian origin. The name has derived from the Russian word salnik that means a gland.

It may refer to:

Andrei Salnikov (born 1982), Russian footballer
Anton Salnikov (born 1979), prizewinner at the Franz Liszt Piano Competition
Oleg Salnikov (born 1975), Russian footballer
Roman Salnikov (born 1976), Ukrainian ice hockey left wing
Sergei Salnikov (1925–1984), Soviet footballer and manager
Vladimir Salnikov (born 1960), Russian swimmer and world record holder
Yuri Salnikov (born 1950), Soviet equestrian and Olympic champion

See also
Selnik (disambiguation)

Russian-language surnames